Rafi-ul-Qadr (Persian: رفیع القدر) (1671 – 29 March 1712), better known by his title, Mirza Rafi' ush-Shan Bahadur, was the third son of the Mughal emperor Bahadur Shah I.

Life and mughal service
Rafi' ush-Shan Bahadur was born in delhi to Prince Muazzam (later Bahadur Shah I) and Nur-un-Nisa Begum, the daughter of Sanjar Najm-i-sani. He was 10 when he was appointed by his grandfather Aurangzeb as qiladar of Malakand until his death; then his father became emperor on 1707. he was subehdar of sindh and assam from 1707 to 1710 and kashmir from 1710 to 1712
He was killed with his elder brother Jahandar Shah by his nephew Farrukhsiyar. He was buried at Agra. His sons Rafi ud-Darajat and Shah Jahan II later became Mughal emperors of India for a brief period.

Family
One of his wives was Raziyat-un-nissa Begum, also known as Safiyat-un-nissa, the daughter of Prince Sultan Muhammad Akbar. He had married her in 1695 at Agra, during the same time as his brother Jahan Shah had married her sister Zakiyat-un-nissa Begum. Another was Nur-un-nissa Begum, daughter of Shaikh Baqi.She was the mother of Emperor Rafi ud-Darajat and of Emperor Muhammad Ibrahim.

References

Bibliography

1671 births
1712 deaths
Mughal princes
Timurid dynasty